Reinaldo Mercado (born 24 September 1949) is a Puerto Rican boxer. He competed in the men's featherweight event at the 1968 Summer Olympics.

References

1949 births
Living people
Puerto Rican male boxers
Olympic boxers of Puerto Rico
Boxers at the 1968 Summer Olympics
People from Cayey, Puerto Rico
Featherweight boxers